St. Cloud Rox may refer to:
St. Cloud Rox (minor league baseball), a professional baseball team that operated in St. Cloud, Minnesota, from 1946 to 1971
St. Cloud Rox (collegiate summer baseball), an amateur baseball team that has operated in St. Cloud, Minnesota, since 1997